The 1997 Premier League speedway season was the second division of speedway in the United Kingdom and governed by the Speedway Control Board (SCB), in conjunction with the British Speedway Promoters' Association (BSPA).

Restructure
A restructure of British speedway took place, with the Premier League becoming the second division and a new Elite League becoming the top division. During the two previous seasons (1995 and 1996) there had been only one division of British speedway also called the Premier League, this confused matters because the Premier League was now only a second tier competition.

Season summary
The Premier League was consisted of 14 teams for the 1997 season, running on a standard format with no play-offs. The Young Shield was introduced as an end of season cup competition for the top eight teams in the league standings.

Reading Racers won the title.

Final table

replaced Skegness Braves mid-season

Premier League Knockout Cup
The 1997 Premier League Knockout Cup was the 30th edition of the Knockout Cup for tier two teams and the first with the name Premier League Knockout Cup. Edinburgh Monarchs were the winners of the competition.

During 1995 and 1996 the British League merged and ran as one newly named Premier League, which therefore meant that the second tier of speedway in the United Kingdom was the 1995 Academy League season, followed one year later by the 1996 Speedway Conference League season.

First round
Northern Group

Southern Group

Semi-finals

Final
First leg

Second leg

Edinburgh were declared Knockout Cup Champions, winning on aggregate 94–86.

Final leading averages

Riders & final averages
Arena Essex

Troy Pratt 8.65
Jan Pedersen 8.42
Colin White 7.22
Tommy Palmer 7.08
David Mason 4.07
John Wainwright 4.00
Paul Lydes-Uings 2.44

Berwick

Scott Lamb 8.57
Jörg Pingel 7.21
Kevin Little 7.18
Mike Smith 6.65
Richard Juul 6.54
David Meldrum 4.97
David Blackburn 4.54
Michael Lowrie 3.91

Edinburgh

Peter Carr 9.88
Kenny McKinna 9.73
Robert Eriksson 9.46
Jarno Kosonen 6.63
Paul Gould 4.45 
Barry Campbell 3.85
Blair Scott 3.68
Neil Hewitt 2.35

Exeter

Michael Coles 8.83
Leigh Lanham 8.76
Frank Smart 7.28 
Peter Jeffery 7.14
Graeme Gordon. 6.18
Gary Lobb 3.52
Paul Fudge 2.86

Glasgow

Neil Collins 9.02 
Mick Powell 8.32
Stewart McDonald 7.47
Sean Courtney 6.91
Will Beveridge 4.44
Grant MacDonald 3.28

Hull

Alan Grahame 9.75 
Stuart Robson 8.37
Scott Robson 7.55 
Peter Scully 6.49
Lee Dicken 5.01
Brian Turner 2.91
Richard Emson 1.95

Isle of Wight/Skegness

Shaun Tacey 8.23
Brett Woodifield 7.63
Nigel Sadler 6.73
Mark Simmonds 6.44
Wayne Carter 6.20
Jason Bunyan 5.71
Paul Clews 3.75
Gavin Hedge 2.70
Lee Dixon 1.14

Long Eaton

Carl Stonehewer 10.39
Martin Dixon 9.81 
Brent Werner 9.27
Justin Elkins 5.06
Paul Lee 4.21
Mark Burrows 4.00
Dean Felton 2.39
Bobby Eldridge 2.18

Newcastle

Paul Bentley 8.81
Jesper Olsen 8.57
Richard Juul 7.73
Stuart Swales 7.13
Glyn Taylor 5.92
Andre Compton 3.80
Brian Turner 3.78
James Birkinshaw 2.00

Newport

Paul Fry 8.75
Anders Henriksson 8.24
Craig Watson 7.72
Scott Pegler 6.12
Martin Willis 4.14
Roger Lobb 3.55

Oxford

Neville Tatum 9.14 
Lawrence Hare 8.46
Philippe Bergé 8.35
Mikael Teurnberg 7.34 
Jason Bunyan 4.41
Jeremy Luckhurst 3.37
Krister Marsh 2.67
Anthony Barlow 2.27
Darren Andrews 1.37

Reading

Dave Mullett 10.47
Glenn Cunningham 9.92 
David Steen 7.75
Lee Richardson 6.73
Paul Pickering 6.50
Krister Marsh 2.43
Bobby Eldridge 2.00

Sheffield

Robbie Kessler 9.76 
Scott Smith 8.95
Mirko Wolter 7.94
Rene Aas 6.89
Steve Knott 5.45
Peter Boast 3.70
Derrol Keats 3.33
Mike Hampson 3.10
James Birkinshaw 3.02

Stoke

Les Collins 9.44 
Phil Morris 6.53
Craig Taylor 6.17
Chris Cobby 5.87
Tony Atkin 5.83
Mark Burrows 4.42

See also
List of United Kingdom Speedway League Champions
Knockout Cup (speedway)

References

Speedway Premier League
1997 in speedway
1997 in British motorsport